HD 12055 is a candidate astrometric binary star system in the southern constellation of Phoenix, near the eastern constellation border with Eridanus. It is yellow in hue and is visible to the naked eye with an apparent visual magnitude of 4.82. The system is located at a distance of approximately 249 light years from the Sun based on parallax, and is drifting further away with a radial velocity of +13 km/s.

The visible component is an aging giant star with a stellar classification of G6III-IIIb. With the supply of hydrogen at its core exhausted, the star has cooled and expanded off the main sequence – at present it has ten times the girth of the Sun. It is around a billion years old with 2.4 times the mass of the Sun and is spinning with a projected rotational velocity of 6 km/s. The star is radiating 71 times the luminosity of the Sun from its photosphere at an effective temperature of 5,196 K.

This system is the most likely source of X-ray emission coming from these coordinates.

References

G-type giants
Astrometric binaries
Phoenix (constellation)
Durchmusterung objects
012055
009095
0574